The 1977 ICF Canoe Slalom World Championships were held in Spittal, Austria under the auspices of International Canoe Federation for the record setting third time. It was the 15th edition. Spittal hosted the championships previously in 1963 and 1965. A record ten countries won medals at these championships, including the first for Australia.

Medal summary

Men's

Canoe

Kayak

Mixed

Canoe

Women's

Kayak

Medals table

References
Results from Spittal
International Canoe Federation

Icf Canoe Slalom World Championships, 1977
ICF Canoe Slalom World Championships
International sports competitions hosted by Austria
Icf Canoe Slalom World Championships, 1977
Canoeing in Austria